The 1975 PBA All-Philippine Championship was the third and last conference of the 1975 PBA season. It started on November 30 and ended on December 14, 1975. The Toyota Comets and the Crispa Redmanizers played for the third championship contested by the league.

The Crispa Redmanizers finally won over the Toyota Comets, three games to two, for their first PBA championship. The Redmanizers also captured the Seven-Up All-Filipino Sports award for the team of the year.

Elimination round

Battle for third

Finals

Byron "Snake" Jones sink four straight charities in the last 55 seconds to give Toyota a 99–95 lead. It was a come-from behind victory by the Comets, which trailed by as much as 10 points thrice in the third quarter, the last at 78–68 and by nine points, 84-75, with eight minutes left in the game.

The Redmanizers rose from an eight-point deficit, 86–94, to take the lead for good at 100–98, on a 14–4 cluster by Adornado, Philip Cezar, Bernie Fabiosa and Rudy Soriano.

Crispa's intense defense forced the Comets into 10 errors alone in the first quarter and the Redmanizers took a 26–14 advantage in the first 12 minutes of play. A couple of sizzling layups by Rey Franco past Toyota import Byron "Snake" Jones highlighted Crispa's surge to its biggest lead of 16 points in the third quarter, 64-48. 

Stan Cherry fired six points in a 10–2 run that shoved Toyota out front, 73-65, and when Crispa closed in to within 71–73, Orly Bauzon and Rodolfo Segura bailed out the Comets, 79-73, with two minutes remaining.

Crispa took an 87–80 lead in the final stretch. Johnny Burks followed fellow import Pete Crotty to the bench with six fouls with still 3:10 left. The Comets came close to within 89–92, with still 1:35 left. Bogs Adornado, who topscored with 18 points, banged in his final basket off Orly Bauzon and though Sonny Jaworski narrowed it down to three, 91–94, Philip Cezar redeemed himself from the previous error by sinking in the clincher for the Redmanizers, a driving lay-up off Ramon Fernandez which triggered off a riot moments later. Toyota coach Dante Silverio, who blamed the referees for the riot, sent in only four men in the last 30 seconds.

Players' scoring averages

(*) Four games only

Occurrences
On December 14, before a record crowd of 32,000 at the Araneta Coliseum, Crispa finally beats Toyota in the championship series, winning Game five, 96-91, to capture the third conference title, dubbed All-Philippine championship. The final game of the season was marred by two bench-clearing free-for-all incidents, both Crispa and Toyota were fined P10,000 each for the melee, Toyota's Oscar Rocha was meted a nine-month suspension, Crispa's Philip Cezar and Toyota's Alberto Reynoso were suspended in four and a half months and fine each.

Broadcast notes

References

External links
 Crispa-Toyota rivalry

All-Philippine Championship